Nechi may refer to:
 Nechí, Colombia
 Nechi, Iran